Pipe Dreams is the fourth album, released February 10, 2009, from Potluck, a rap group from Humboldt County, California. It features 21 tracks, with guest appearances such as the Kottonmouth Kings, Krizz Kaliko, Twiztid and more. The album's first single, Stoner Bitch, had its video released on YouTube on February 3, 2009. The album went on to appear on the Billboard Top Heatseekers chart at #30 on February 28, 2009.

Track listing

References

Potluck (group) albums
2009 albums